Underdog is a 2018 South Korean animated film about the story of abandoned dogs. The film is directed by Lee Chun-baek and Oh Sung-yoon and stars Do Kyung-soo, Park So-dam and Park Chul-min. It was released in theaters on January 16, 2019.

The film opened the 22nd Bucheon International Fantastic Film Festival in July 2018. Tickets for the film were sold out in 9 seconds, setting a record for the shortest time for an opening film at the BIFAN to be sold in such time. It was also chosen to be screened in North Korea as the first act of the South Korea-North Korea film exchange program.

Underdog was featured in the Taiwanese Kaohsiung Film Festival in the Kids Fantasy section on October 20–21, 2018.

In March, 2019, Underdog was featured in Tokyo Anime Award Festival, being the first Korean film to do so. In June 2019, Underdog was featured in Annecy International Animated Film Festival, being the only Korean animation film out of eight to do so.

Plot 
Stray dogs who have been abandoned by humans find a place without humans' and realize their identities and the meaning of freedom and self-identity.

Cast 
 Doh Kyung-soo as Moongchi (a Border Collie)
 Park So-dam as Bami (a wild dog)
 Park Chul-min as Jjangah
Lee Jun-hyuk as Hunter
 Jeon Sook-kyung as Ari
 Yeon Ji-won as Tari
 Kang Seok as Gaeko (a German Shepherd)
 Park Joong-geum as Cari
 Tak Won-jung as Bongji (A Scottish Terrier)

Production 
Director Oh Sung-yoon had previously directed the animated film Leafie, A Hen into the Wild (2011). The production of Underdog started in April 2013 and ended in June 2018. Dubbing began in January 2016.

Original soundtrack

Release 
Before its premiere, Underdog was sold to 69 territories including France, United States, Canada, Hong Kong, Malaysia, Singapore and Indonesia.

Promotion 
On January 7, directors Oh Sung-yoon and Lee Chun-baek and voice actors Do Kyung-soo, Park So-dam and Lee Jun-hyuk attended the film's preview at CGV Yongsan I'park Mall. On January 15, the directors and voice actors held a showcase for the film at Lotte Cinema World Tower.

Underdog has also opened a funding for rescuing abandoned animals. Donators were rewarded with figurine and dolls of the main characters Moongchi and Bami.

Awards and nominations

See also
South Korean animation
List of Korean animated films

References

External links 
 
 

 

2010s Korean-language films
South Korean animated films
Animated films about dogs
2018 animated films
2018 films
2010s South Korean films